Plays for New Audiences (formerly Plays for Young Audiences) is the script licensing division of Children's Theatre Company that focuses on plays for multigenerational audiences and actors. PNA’s catalog features plays and musicals produced, commissioned, and curated by theaters for young audiences including Seattle Children's Theatre, Chicago Children's Theatre, and Imagination Stage, along with pieces commissioned by Children's Theatre Company. The children's theater movement developed in the United States in the 1960s, and at that time the canon of work for family audiences began to build. 

Plays for New Audiences began in July 2004 to provide scripts developed by Seattle Children's Theatre and the Children's Theatre Company to professional theaters, amateur/community theatres, churches, libraries and schools.

References 

Children's theatre